Daniel Voženílek (born February 10, 1996) is a Czech professional ice hockey player. He currently plays extra league with the HC Oceláři Třinec.

Voženílek made his Czech Extraliga debut playing with HC Dynamo Pardubice  during the 2013-14 Czech Extraliga season.

References

External links

1996 births
Living people
Czech ice hockey forwards
HC Dynamo Pardubice players
Sportspeople from Pardubice
HC Oceláři Třinec players
Czech expatriate ice hockey players in Finland
LHK Jestřábi Prostějov players